Drake may refer to:

Animals
 A male duck

People and fictional characters 
 Drake (surname), a list of people and fictional characters with the family name
 Drake (given name), a list of people and fictional characters with the given name
 Drake (musician) (born 1986), Canadian rapper, singer, and actor Aubrey Drake Graham

Places

United States 
 Drake, Arizona, an unincorporated community
 Drake, Colorado, an unincorporated community
 Drake, Illinois, an unincorporated community
 Drake, Kentucky, an unincorporated community
 Drake, Missouri, an unincorporated community
 Drake, North Dakota, a town
 Drake, North Carolina, a place in Nash County near Dr. Franklin Hart Farm
 Drake, South Carolina, an unincorporated community
 Drake Park, Bend, Oregon

Antarctica
 Drake Passage, between Cape Horn and Antarctica
 Drake Head, Oates Land, a headland
 Drake Icefall, Ellsworth Land

Australia
 Drake County, New South Wales, Australia
 Drake, New South Wales, a parish and rural community

Elsewhere 
 Drake, Saskatchewan, Canada, a village
 Drake (ward), a ward in the city of Plymouth, United Kingdom

Ships 
 , several British Royal Navy ships
 Drake-class cruiser, a Royal Navy class of armoured cruisers in service up to 1920
 MV Xanthea, formerly MV Drake, a bulk carrier launched in 2006
 Drake (ship), various ships

Schools and educational facilities 
 Drake University, Des Moines, Iowa, United States
 Drake Bulldogs, the school's athletic program
 Drake Stadium (1904), an outdoor multiuse sports field at Drake University from 1904 to 1925
 Drake Stadium (Drake University), a sports facility on the campus
 Drake Fieldhouse, an athletic facility
 Drake Stadium (UCLA), University of California, Los Angeles
 Drake Field (stadium), Auburn University
 Drake Performance and Event Center, Ohio State University
 J. F. Drake Middle School, Auburn, Alabama
 O. B. Drake Middle School, Arvada, Colorado
 Drake Planetarium and Science Center, Cincinnati, Ohio

Other uses 
 Battle of Goodenough Island or Operation Drake, a World War II battle
 Drake Supermarkets, an Australian chain
 Drake Hotel (disambiguation)
 Drake baronets, three titles in the Baronetage of England and one in the Baronetage of Great Britain
 Drake Street, Hong Kong
 Drake (mythology), a term related to and often synonymous with dragon
 Drake Field, a public-use airport south of Fayetteville, Arkansas
 Drake, two variants of the Goodyear Duck 1940s American light amphibious aircraft
 Drake Memorial Hospital, Cincinnati, Ohio, notable as a locale for crimes by serial killer Donald Harvey
 The Drake, the fictional hotel that is the subject of the American TV series 666 Park Avenue

See also 
 R. L. Drake Company, electronics manufacturer
 Drake equation
 Drake Fountain, Chicago, Illinois
 Drake House (disambiguation)
 Drake Well, an oil well in Pennsylvania which sparked the first oil boom in the United States
 Drake Group, a network of  American academics who believe that college athletics has become too powerful
 Drake's (disambiguation), a list of Drake's and Drakes